Arzamassky District is an administrative district (raion), one of the forty in Nizhny Novgorod Oblast, Russia. Municipally, it is incorporated as Arzamassky Municipal District. It is located in the southern central part of the oblast. Its administrative center is the city of Arzamas (which is not administratively a part of the district). Population: 43,723 (2010 Census);

History
The district was established in 1929.

Administrative and municipal status
Within the framework of administrative divisions, Arzamassky District is one of the forty in the oblast. The city of Arzamas serves as its administrative center, despite being incorporated separately as a city of oblast significance—an administrative unit with the status equal to that of the districts.

As a municipal division, the district is incorporated as Arzamassky Municipal District. The city of oblast significance of Arzamas is incorporated separately from the district as Arzamas Urban Okrug.

Transportation

A narrow gauge railway serving the Peshelan gypsum mine is located in the village of Bebyayevo.

Notable residents 

Alena Arzamasskaia (died 1670), famed female rebel fighter, born in Vyezdnaya
Valentina Telichkina (born 1945), actress, born in the village of Krasnoye

References

Notes

Sources

Districts of Nizhny Novgorod Oblast
States and territories established in 1929